"Two Hearts'" is a hit duet sung by American R&B singers Stephanie Mills and Teddy Pendergrass, from Mills' fifth studio album Stephanie (1981). 
The song was written and produced by James Mtume , Reggie Lucas and Tawatha Agee. Released in January 1981, the single reached number 40 on the US Billboard Hot 100 in 1981. On the US Billboard R&B chart, "Two Hearts" reached number three.

Track listing
 "Two Hearts" (12" version)
 "Two Hearts" (Club Mix)
 "I Just Wanna Say"
 "You're My Choice Tonight"

Charts

References

1981 singles
Stephanie Mills songs
Teddy Pendergrass songs
Male–female vocal duets
1981 songs
Songs written by Tawatha Agee
Songs written by James Mtume
Songs written by Reggie Lucas
20th Century Fox Records singles